7-Hydroxymethyl chlorophyll a reductase (HCAR) is an enzyme with systematic name 71-hydroxychlorophyll a:ferredoxin oxidoreductase. This enzyme catalyses the following chemical reaction

 71-hydroxychlorophyll a + 2 reduced ferredoxin + 2 H+  chlorophyll a + 2 oxidized ferredoxin + H2O

7-Hydroxymethyl chlorophyll is a reductase that contains FAD and an iron-sulfur center.

References

External links 
 

EC 1.17.7